Chesterfield F.C. is an English football club based in Chesterfield, Derbyshire. During the 2010–11 season, the club competed in League Two, the fourth tier of English football, for the fourth year in succession. The club finished the season as champions, earning automatic promotion to League One.

Competitions

Football League Two

League table

Matches

FA Cup

League Cup

Football League Trophy

Appearances and goals

As of 6 May 2011.
(Substitute appearances in brackets)

Awards

Transfers

References

Chesterfield
Chesterfield F.C. seasons